ClickBus is a price comparison and online booking website for long-distance bus routes. The company was founded in 2013 by co-founders Eduardo Madeiros and Marcos Sterenkrantz.
ClickBus is a global chain of bus ticket resellers, founded by German start up accelerator Rocket Internet. As of today, ClickBus has websites setup and running in Brazil, Colombia, Mexico, and Turkey. Services in Germany, Thailand, Pakistan, and Poland have been discontinued.
Users can obtain bus tickets using the desktop sites or downloading a mobile app available for the Google Android or iOS operating system in Brazil. 
In Brazil alone, ClickBus offers customers over 6,000 routes between cities and it is the market leader for online bus tickets

Founders
In 2013, Brazilian Mexico-based Eduardo Medeiros a long-time startup expert had the idea to start an online one-stop bus ticket portal, along with his friend Marcos Sterenkrantz and brought it to the attention of Rocket Internet GmbH who took on the challenge to gather investors such as Millicom. The first investment round granted ClickBus a capital injection of around US$2.15 million and involved a number of investors.

Platform
The platform is designed to aggregate bus travel information and allowing users to purchase tickets at the same price being offered by bus providers. It also features a simplified booking system and wide range of routes in each country of operation. Users are able to select specific dates, prices, departures and places of arrival.

Operations

ClickBus operated in 7 countries in Europe, Latin America and North America. As of 2015, only the service in Brazil, Columbia, Mexico, and Turkey are still operational.

Brazil

The Brazilian website operates in over 3000 locations across Brazil including: São Paulo, Rio de Janeiro and Belo Horizonte.

Germany

The German website operated under the name of KlickBus and provided users with routes to all major cities in Germany including Berlin, Hamburg and Munich. The expansion came shortly after a law in Germany binding all bus companies to the Government came to an end sparking much growth from private bus operators. In late 2014, the website was shut down.

Mexico
The Mexican website operates in over 3000 locations across Mexico including: Guadalajara and León, Guanajuato.

Turkey
ClickBus started its operations in Turkey July 2014. Company has first launched with the name Tikobus, then continued the business with the global brand name ClickBus. ClickBus Turkey merged with Turkey's oldest travel booking platform NeredenNereye.com in 2015. NeredenNereye founded by Erol Demirtaş has started operations in 1999 and has been selling bus and airline tickets since 2009.

References

External links
 ClickBus Brazil

Automotive websites
Bus operating companies
Road transport in Europe